Sons of the Land was a joint list of the Popular Front for the Liberation of Palestine and independents for the May 2005 municipal elections in Beit Jala, the West Bank. The list won 5 seats. The top candidate of the list was Nadir Antoun Issa Abu Ashma.

References

Bethlehem municipal election blocs
Defunct political party alliances in the Palestinian territories
Popular Front for the Liberation of Palestine